Kiełczyn may refer to the following places in Poland:
Kiełczyn, Lower Silesian Voivodeship (south-west Poland)
Kiełczyn, Greater Poland Voivodeship (west-central Poland)